The de Havilland DH.75 Hawk Moth was a 1920s British four-seat cabin monoplane built by de Havilland at Stag Lane Aerodrome, Edgware.

Design and development
The DH.75 Hawk Moth was the first of a family of high-wing monoplane Moths, and was designed as a light transport or air-taxi for export.  The aircraft had a fabric-covered steel-tube fuselage and wooden wings. The Hawk Moth was first flown on 7 December 1928 from Stag Lane. The first aircraft used a 200 hp (149 kW) de Havilland Ghost engine. This engine comprised two de Havilland Gipsys mounted on a common crankcase to form an air-cooled V-8. With the Ghost, the aircraft was underpowered and a 240 hp (179 kW) Armstrong Siddeley Lynx radial engine was fitted to it and all but one production aircraft. Changes were also made to the structure including increased span and chord wings and the aircraft was redesignated the DH.75A.

In December 1929 the first aircraft was demonstrated in Canada with both wheel and ski undercarriage. Following trials with the second aircraft on floats, the Canadian government ordered three aircraft for civil use. The first Canadian aircraft (actually the first Hawk Moth) did not have doors on the port side and could therefore not be used as a floatplane, so it was used by the Controller of Civil Aircraft. Further tests were carried out by de Havilland Canada in 1930, and the second and third aircraft were cleared to use floats. With restrictions on payload when fitted with floats the Canadian aircraft were used only on skis or wheels. In an attempt to compete with American-designed aircraft, the eighth aircraft was produced as the DH.75B with a 300 hp (224 kW) Wright Whirlwind engine. Production was stopped and two aircraft were not completed.

Operational service
With three aircraft operating in Canada a further two were exported to Australia.
One of the Australian aircraft, VH-UNW ex G-AAFX, was used by Amy Johnson to fly from Brisbane to Sydney in 1930 when her De Havilland Moth Jason was damaged. Major De Havilland later flew Miss Johnson to Perth in the aircraft, from where she returned to Britain by ship. VH-UNW was later sold to Hart Aircraft Service of Melbourne who used it mainly for joy flights. In February 1934 it was sold to Tasmanian Airways as the City of Hobart to run between Brighton, Tasmania and Launceston, Tasmania which it continued to do until it made a forced landing at Brighton on 10 January 1935 after a piston-rod failure, and the engine appears to have been found beyond repair. By mid-1936 the engine-less airframe had been sold to G. H. "Harry" Purvis who refitted it with a Wright Whirlwind engine and used it to conduct joy flights in New South Wales. It last flew for Connellan Airways of Alice Springs and was withdrawn from service in 1949.

Variants
DH.75
Prototype with de Havilland Ghost V8 engine; one built, later re-engined.
DH.75A
Production version with Armstrong Siddeley Lynx VIA radial piston engine; six built.
DH.75B
Final production aircraft fitted with a 300 hp (224 kW) Wright R-975 Whirlwind radial engine; one built. DH.75A VH-UNW retrofitted to this standard in 1936.

Operators

Royal Australian Air Force

Royal Canadian Air Force

Royal Air Force

Specifications (D.H.75A (Landplane))

See also
 List of de Havilland aircraft

Notes

References

http://www.australianflying.com.au/news/the-de-havilland-dh-75-hawk-moth-in-australia

Single-engined tractor aircraft
High-wing aircraft
1920s British civil utility aircraft
Hawk Moth
Aircraft first flown in 1928